District Planning is the process of planning covering all local governments in a district based on a district-level development policy and integrating the district and sub-district plans of all the local governments into a consolidated district plan which will later be integrated with the state plan. The District Planning process will take into account the resources (natural, human and financial) and the extent of legal responsibilities  assigned to the district and below level governments, during the preparation of the district plan.

The history of district planning in Kerala is that of intermittent attempts, partial successes and long neglect. It doesn't show any promising growth pattern. But there were many attempts started with sincerity and ended without any worthy output; all those attempts were good learning examples worthy of learning the bottlenecks. A brief history of those attempts is as follows:

Early initiatives
Bringing out a district plan document giving district wise break-up of the annual plan began in the late 1960s and early 1970s. That could be the first event in the lineage of district planning exercise in Kerala. Each department prepared district-wise break up of schemes divisible among districts. That district-wise break-up of schemes has been consolidated into a single document by the Kerala State Planning Board for better monitoring of the state plan at the district level. There was neither any sort of district planning nor any attempt for integration of sectoral schemes at the district level during the period. Those district plans were mere compilations of departmental or similar programmes into a single volume. They were useful for coordination and monitoring, but do not deserve the status of district plans.

In 1976, a District Planning Unit was set up in the Kerala State Planning Board. Later, it was transformed into Decentralized Planning Division in the State Planning Board. In the year 1979, the district planning offices were set up in all the districts except in Wayanad.

Kollam district plan
The district planning offices in Kerala were entrusted with the task of creation of database for each district, by compiling all available secondary data. Kollam district conducted a resource potential survey and went ahead with district planning as a pilot project with focus on industrial sector.

A district planning committee was set up with district collector as chairperson to formulate the district plan. District Development Committee - an advisory body of officials and non-officials including the MLA's and MPs in the district, headed by the District Collector, was expected to function as the local planning machinery in the district. The dormant grama panchayats and municipalities were the existing elected local governments below the district level. Eleven technical committees were constituted for each of the major development sectors.  Block planning committees were formed at every block consisting of the Chair Person of the Block Development Committee, Presidents of all the Panchayats in the block area and officials of different development departments of the concerned blocks.

The district planning exercise in Kollam district was divided into two stages.

Stage I: - Assessment of resource endowments and the development potential of the district which included:

 Identification of local natural resources
 Survey of infrastructure, and
 Review of development of different sectors and ongoing schemes in the district

Stage II: - Preparation of the district plan by involving people's representatives and local government officials.

The District Development Committee had set up the planning bodies, Block planning committee meetings were convened and the planning procedures were explained to all actors. Panchayats were requested to discuss and decide their resource endowments, identify development problems, the schemes and projects to be included in their plan and to involve the experts available locally in the execution of the process. Panchayats were able to complete the tasks in two/three meetings. The block planning committee met again after a month to review the proposals from the Panchayats. They reviewed, modified or supplemented the projects to make them complete or perfect and transmitted those plans to the technical committees at the district. The technical committees held several rounds of discussion to make them conform to the standards of the state level schemes. New proposals were then formulated by the technical committees, whenever needed. The strategies for development of the sector were also evolved by those technical committees.

The procedure evolved in this experiment formed the basis of the guidelines for preparation of district plans by Kerala State Planning Board later.
The Seventh Five-Year Plan visualized decentralization of planning process from the State-level to the level of districts in the first phase, and then further down to the block level, to increase the effectiveness in implementation of the anti-poverty programmes and to ensure balanced regional development. So the Planning Commission suggested the State government to formulate comprehensive district plans in two or three districts as an experiment.

Modality of the process

As per the guideline, the exercise of district planning had to start with a resource survey and preparation of a resource inventory based on secondary data as well as through primary survey for both natural and human resources. It was followed by an assessment of the felt needs of the district and formulation of a set of priorities consistent with the State and National priorities. After that, an assessment of the financial resources covering 'untied funds', flowing to the district from state and central schemes as well as the  institutional finance, has to be made. The guidelines suggested for the preparation of a perspective plan that should show the long-term development needs and the development potential of the district. The next step was to draw up five-year and annual plans. Such district plans were then to be integrated with the state plan.
The guideline suggested an effective monitoring mechanism at the district and the State level to monitor the implementation of the district plan, in terms of finance, physical achievements, devolution of appropriate administrative / financial powers and preparation of district budget. The last item in the nine-point guideline envisaged "involving Panchayat Raj Institutions and enlisting the co-operation of the voluntary agencies in the process of decentralised planning".

Subsequent experiments
In order to experiment a pilot exercise in district planning, two districts - Kottayam among the developed and Kannur among the backward – were selected. District development committees were entrusted with the overall responsibility of drawing up district plans. A small executive committee was constituted with a district collector as the chairperson, the chairperson of the district development committee as the member-secretary, and selected district officers as members to assist the district development committee in drawing up the plan. Blocks were proposed as the primary units for the district planning exercise. Block planning committees were constituted with one of the district level officers of the development departments as chairperson and BDO as member-secretary. The role of district planning officer was to help the district development committee prepare the block-level inventory of resources & infrastructure and to make a report on the prospects of development. The block planning committees had to assess the felt needs of the different panchayats through discussion and dialogue with representatives of local people. Since the elections to the Panchayats were not held, they were not associated with this district planning exercise. The procedures for enhancing people’s participation and details of development analysis to be made were determined by the concerned district development committee.

The Planning Commission of India later modified the earlier guideline stating that the financial assistance for the exercise could be made only if the study would be entrusted to private consultancy organizations.  Accordingly, the above modality was abandoned and the Institute of Management in Government and Kerala Statistical Institute were entrusted with the responsibility of drawing up district plans, respectively for the districts of Kannur and Kottayam. The exercise was, however, kept outside the purview of planning in the State or in the districts in the matter of Five-Year Plan and Annual Plan formulation and was undertaken only as an experimental 'model' in the district planning.

Kottayam District Plan

The Kerala Statistical Institute started working on the district plan of Kottayam district from December 1988, with focus on land use planning. The resource inventory was prepared based on secondary data. The exercise focused on the preparation of schemes from below in consonance with the felt needs of the people in different localities. As there were no elected bodies at the block and the district levels, meetings of the block planning committees consisting of elected MLAs, Panchayat Presidents, officials, other non-officials and Municipal Councilors, were convened regularly. The committees were expected to put forth development proposals considering the overall development needs, potentials and the felt needs of the people in the region.

During that time, the official preparations for district level plans, as part of the Eighth Plan of the State started in the districts. The outlay for Kottayam district in the Eighth plan was Rs. 90 crore.  The Kerala Statistical Institute decided to make use of the list of schemes which was being prepared for the government. It invited proposals from the Panchayats based on the list and dovetailed the output to suit an estimated  financial outlay of Rs. 100 crore  for the public sector as  calculated by them. Discussions were held in the BDCs. The panchayat presidents were entrusted with holding discussions in the Panchayats before making suggestions regarding the schemes. The block level discussions were over by January 1989 in all the 11 blocks of the district. By February, meetings were also held in the municipalities. Approximately 700 persons attended those meetings held throughout the district. By July 1989, around 40 Panchayats had submitted their proposals in the prescribed formats and in total 73 Panchayats submitted their projects by the end.

Simultaneously, main problems and priorities of the panchayats, particularly with reference to infrastructure facilities, were collected from the Panchayat Presidents with the help of a questionnaire. The Kerala Statistical Institute also undertook a sample household survey to understand the felt needs of the people, to supplement this input. Four panchayats and one municipality were chosen for the sample survey from among the 73 panchayats and the four municipalities. The schemes collected from the Panchayats and the blocks, with the data supplemented from Krishi Bhavans, Panchayats and household survey, formed the basis of the district plan report. Some of the proposals were of good quality, whereas some others were the 'usual type' consisting of construction of roads and bridges. The Kerala Statistical Institute dovetailed them within the fixed total outlay of Rs.100 crore and prepared the final district plan.

The district plan was not exactly a compendium of finally selected projects; rather it was an account of the understanding of the consultants regarding the felt needs of the people as expressed by different actors involved in the planning process and the consultants' assessment of the resource endowment of the district.

The proposals from below sought to have  a lower allocation for agriculture while proposing higher outlays for the allied agricultural sectors such as animal husbandry, dairy, and fisheries in contrast with the actual district sector outlays of the state plan. The allocation demanded for rural development, which perhaps covered anti-poverty and employment generation schemes, was also much higher than the actual allocations. The substantially lower allocation proposed from below on roads was surprising. On the other hand, housing figured prominently in the Kerala Statistical Institute plan than the actual allocation available for the district. At the same time, the allocation for SC/ST welfare was much lesser than half of the actual allotment.

The conclusion of the exercise was not very encouraging. It underlined that in the task of identification of schemes and projects of local significance and in presentation of them with adequate details such as importance, costs and benefits, the general public can make very little contribution.  The people's participation at the panchayat level was very limited.

Kannur District Plan

The Kannur District Plan was more a methodological exercise than an operational one. It was submitted on December 1992, almost two years after the Kottayam Plan when the first elected District Councils  of Kerala had assumed power. The purpose of the plan was to refine the procedural aspects in district planning.

The first step in the planning was to make an analysis of situation, which included preparation of district profile, resource inventory through secondary data collection and mapping techniques, and also through primary survey whenever needed, especially using RRA techniques.

The second step in the planning process was to have a sectoral and spatial analysis of the district, which included identification of watershed, geo-climatic typologies, spatial profile of poverty and unemployment, sectoral review of potentials, etc.

In the third step, formulation of objectives and strategies based on the situation analysis made earlier was done. The plan reflected the felt needs of the Panchayats / Non Governmental Organisations and contained the long-term and short-term objectives, as well as sectoral strategies.

Preparation of development programmes and development projects for inclusion in district plan was the fourth step. A quantitative and spatial schematic plan was drawn up based on a development dialogue with the District Council regarding the financial resource position and development priorities. But this had never happened at all. The experiment met with a premature death.

District plans in 2000

In the third year  of the much acclaimed Peoples Planning in Kerala, an attempt was made to draw up the district plan  for each district in order to complete the cycle of decentralized planning.
The basic objectives of the above said district planning experiment was threefold.
%	to make an assessment of the district, its resources and to provide a macro perspective for district development
%	to consolidate local government plans
%	to formulate guidelines for local planning for subsequent years
Based on those objectives, district plans were drawn up in the districts with the following three parts or sections.
 Perspective for district development
 Consolidated plans of the local governments
 Guidelines for future

The Part I of the district plan was proposed to be prepared once in five years at the beginning of the five-year plan. Part II and Part III of the district plan were expected to be prepared every year.

The district plan for each of the 14 districts in Kerala was prepared in the year 2000. The integration of local plans revealed the duplications, gaps and contradictions in the people's planning. As well, it provided guidelines for the preparation of the next years annual plans in the district.

The exercise indicated that district plan, in the absence of clear objectives, proper methodology and meticulous preparation can degenerate itself into a bundle of statistics and schemes, without any coherence, direction and integration. So the district planners should have a through knowledge of the objectives of the state and national planning and should customize the district plan in tune with the objectives of the higher level plans while balancing with the projects arising from below.

References

External links
 From Decentralised Planning to Peoples Planning : Experiences of the Indian States of West Bengal and Kerala, by Charvak, Discussion Paper No 21 July 2000, KRPLLD, Centre for Development Studies, Thiruvananthapuram
Website on Decentralisation and Local Governance in Kerala

Other links
 District planning in India
 Local Governance in Kerala
 Peoples Planning in Kerala
 District Planning Committees in India

References
	Charvak (2001) : From Decentralisation of Planning to Peoples Planning - Experiences of the Indian States of West Bengal and Kerala. Discussion Paper No.21, July 2000. Kerala Research Programme on Local Level Development. Thiruvananthapuram, Centre for Development Studies.
	FAO (1995): District Planning: Lessons from India –Planning Guide. Rome, FAO
	Govt. of India (2005): Backward Region Grant Fund Programme Guidelines. New Delhi, Ministry of Panchayati Raj.
	Govt. of India (1978): Report of the Working Group on Block Level Planning (M. L. Dantwala Committee Report). New Delhi, Planning Commission
	Govt. of India (1984): Report of Working Group on District Planning (C. H. Hanumantha Rao Committee Report) . Part I, New Delhi, Planning Commission
	Govt. of India (1985): Report of Working Group on District Planning (C. H. Hanumantha Rao Committee Report) Part  II. New Delhi, Planning Commission
	Institute for Management in Government (1993): A District Plan for Kannur. Thiruvananthapuram, Institute of Management in Government
	Kerala Statistical Institute (1988): A Note on Preparation of a District Plan for Kottayam.
	Kerala Statistical Institute (1989): Second Quarterly Progress report of District Plan Preparation for Kottayam. Thiruvananthapuram, Kerala Statistical Institute
	Mukherjee Amitava (1990a): Foundation of Decentralisation with Special Reference to District Planning in India, Vol.2. New Delhi, Heritage
	Mukherjee Amitava (1990b): Researches in Decentralisation with Special Reference to District Planning in India. New Delhi, Heritage
	Mukherjee Amitava (1991a): Methodology and Database for Decentralised Planning with Reference to District Planning in India, Vol.3 Part A.  New Delhi, Heritage
	Mukherjee Amitava (1991b): Methodology and Database for Decentralised Planning with Reference to District Planning in India, Vol.3 Part B.  New Delhi, Heritage
	Mukherjee Amitava (1992): Methodology and Database for Decentralised Planning with Special Reference to District Planning in India. Vol.3 Part C. New Delhi, Heritage.
       Rajasekharan, K: District planning in Kerala : The concept, history and procedures In T M Joseph : Decentralized governance and development, New Delhi, Deep & Deep,2009 P 214 -241

Local government in Kerala
Economic planning in India